Hreiðars þáttr heimska or the Tale of Hreiðarr the Stupid is one of the short tales of Icelanders. It tells of Hreiðarr, an apparently mentally disabled Icelandic man who travels to Norway in the time of the joint rule of the kings Magnús góði and Haraldr harðráði. Hreiðarr befriends Magnús with his eccentric behaviour but incurs the wrath of Haraldr when he kills one of his courtiers.

The story is preserved as a part of Morkinskinna and its derivative, Hulda-Hrokkinskinna, but it may originally have existed as a separate written work. It is believed to be among the oldest stories of its kind, perhaps originally composed around 1200 and certainly no later than the mid-13th century. Although the story is realistic and plausible, it is believed to be fictitious.

References

 Faulkes, Anthony (editor) (1978). Two Icelandic Stories : Hreiðars þáttr : Orms þáttr. Viking Society for Northern Research. 
 Faulkes, Anthony (editor) (2011²). Two Icelandic Stories : Hreiðars þáttr : Orms þáttr. New edition with corrections and further additions. London: Viking Society for Northern Research & University College London. . Open access edition.
 Hreidar's Tale. Translated by Robert Kellogg. En: Viðar Hreinsson (General Editor): The Complete Sagas of Icelanders including 49 Tales. Reykjavík: Leifur Eiríksson Publishing, 1997. Volume I, pp. 375–384. .

External links
Hreiðars þáttr Old Norse text at heimskringla.no
Hreiðars þáttur An edition of the story in modern Icelandic spelling

Þættir